Petey may refer to:

People
 Petey Greene (1931–1984), African-American television and radio talk-show host
 Petey Pablo (born 1973), stage name of American rapper Moses Barrett III
 Petey Perot (born 1957), American retired National Football League player
 Petey Rosenberg (1918–1997), American professional basketball player
 Petey Sarron (1906–1994), American boxer
 Petey Scalzo (1917–1993), American boxer
 Petey Sessoms (born 1972), American retired professional basketball player
 Petey Williams (born 1981), Canadian professional wrestler
 Petey (musician), an American musician and TikTok personality

Entertainment
 Pete the Pup, a character in Hal Roach's Our Gang comedies, nicknamed "Petey"
 Petey (novel), a 1998 children's novel by Ben Mikaelsen
 Petey, the title character of The Puppy's Further Adventures, an American animated TV series
 Petey Piranha, a recurring boss in the Mario franchise

Other uses
 Petey (satellite)
 Petey (mascot), the mascot of the Canisius Golden Griffins, the athletic teams of Canisius College

See also
 P. T. (disambiguation)
 PT (disambiguation)

Masculine given names
Hypocorisms
Lists of people by nickname